Hemiconus granatinus is an extinct species of sea snail, a marine gastropod mollusk, in the family Conidae, the cone snails and their allies.

Distribution
Fossils of this marine species were found in France.

References

 Deshayes, J.P., 1865. Description des animaux sans vertèbres découverts dans le Bassin de Paris pour servir de supplément à la description des coquilles fossiles des environs de Paris, comprenant une révision générale de toutes les espèces connues. Tome 3, Mollusques Céphalés (livraisons 45–50), 2 e partie, Atlas II. Baillère and Fils, Paris.
 Tracey S., Craig B., Belliard L. & Gain O. (2017). One, four or forty species? - early Conidae (Mollusca, Gastropoda) that led to a radiation and biodiversity peak in the late Lutetian Eocene of the Cotentin, NW France. Carnets de Voyages Paléontologiques dans le Bassin Anglo-Parisien. 3: 1-38.

granatinus
Gastropods described in 1865